The Zephyr is a series of high-altitude platform station aircraft produced by Airbus.

They were designed originally by QinetiQ, a commercial offshoot of the UK Ministry of Defence.
In July 2010, the Zephyr 7 flew during 14 days.
In March 2013, the project was sold to Airbus Defence and Space.
In the summer of 2022, the Zephyr 8/S flew during 64 days.

The unmanned aerial vehicles are powered by solar cells, recharging batteries in daylight to stay aloft at night.
They can be used for mobile phone coverage,  environmental monitoring, military reconnaissance or as a communications relay.

Development

Zephyr 3 

It was envisionned as an alternative to space satellites, stationed permanently in the stratosphere for environmental monitoring, mobile phone coverage or military applications.
The QinetiQ 1 balloon altitude record attempt failed in 2003.

In February 2005, Qinetiq was preparing a demonstration above 30,000 ft for the UK Ministry of Defence at the Woomera Test Range in Australia, for reconnaissance or as a communications relay.

Zephyr 6 

Between 28 and 31 July 2008, in a demonstration for the US military at its Yuma Proving Ground in Arizona, the Zephyr 6 flew for 82 hours and 37 minutes, an unofficial record as the FAI wasn't involved.

Zephyr 7 

On 23 July 2010, the Zephyr 7 took the FAI-sanctioned duration record after a 336 hours (14 days), 22 min and 8 s flight, reaching . It exceeded the nine days (216 hours) of the 1986 round-the-world flight of the Rutan Voyager.

In March 2013, the project was sold to EADS Astrium (now Airbus Defence and Space).

In 2014 it flew for 11 days in the short days of winter whilst carrying a small payload for the British Ministry of Defence, and later near civilian airspace.

Zephyr 8/S 

In February 2016, the UK Ministry of Defence purchased two Zephyr 8 planes. In August 2016, a third was purchased.

In 2016, a twin-tailed Zephyr T variant, providing a maritime surveillance and communications capability, was scheduled for flight testing in 2018.

In summer 2018, for its maiden flight from Arizona, the Zephyr S remained aloft for 25 days 23 hours 57 minutes, nearly twice as long as the previous record flight of 14 days set by its predecessor. 
By October 2021, it had flown 2,435 hours.

On 15 June 2022, the Zephyr S took off in Arizona, venturing for the first time into international airspace and over water. On 19 August, the plane was lost over the Arizona desert after a flight time of 64 days. It covered 30,000 nmi (56,000 km) over the southern United States, the Gulf of Mexico, and South America.

The aircraft was lost when one engine component (redesigned since) failed in an unusual high-altitude storm turbulence at 57,000 ft.
By early 2023, Airbus planned to launch operations from the end of 2024 with around 18 aircraft.
By 2034, a 1,000 aircraft constellation could cover 2.9 billion people, and would provide emergency 4G/5G following natural disasters.
The larger Zephyr variant, with twice the payload capacity, is expected for 2026.

Design

Zephyr 3 

Zephyr 6 

The carbon fiber Zephyr 6 has a  span and weighs 30-34 kg (70 lb) for a 2 kg (4.5 lb) payload.
Amorphous silicon solar cells from Unisolar recharge lithium-sulphur batteries from Sion Corporation with twice the energy density of the best alternative, lithium polymer batteries.
Launched by hand, it can reach 18 km (60,000 ft).
The first version had a battery capacity of 3 kW·h, driving two propellers.

Zephyr 7 
Zephyr 7 was larger, at 53 kg, and capable of a maximum altitude between 65,000 and 70,000 feet, it required five ground crew to launch, as opposed to three previously for the Zephyr 6.

Zephyr 8/S 

It weighs 60 kg, 40% of which are batteries (kg), and the 5 kg payload can transmit video with a 50 cm resolution from above 65,000 ft.
They should be able to operate year-round between 40 degrees North and South, while winter operation gets more difficult at higher latitudes.

It used Amprius lithium-ion batteries with silicon nanowire anodes for a 435 Wh/kg specific energy up from 300–320 Wh/kg. Solar cells are High-efficiency, lightweight, and flexible inverted metamorphic multi-junction epitaxial lift-off GaAs sheets manufactured by MicroLink Devices, with specific power exceeding 1,500 W/kg and areal powers greater than 350 W/m2.

One Zephyr can replace 250 cell phone towers. It can be used to perform intelligence, surveillance and reconnaissance (ISR) with a wide visual payload coverage of 20×30 km (12.4×18.6 mi) and can be equipped with radar, LIDAR and infrared technologies.

Endurance is targeted for up to 200-300 days.
An 8 kg (17.6 lb) mobile connectivity payload can serve up to 100,000 people on the ground.
A 5 kg Airbus-developed Opaz optical sensor can deliver 18 cm-resolution imagery.

Specifications

Accidents and incidents
, three hull losses have been reported:
 March 2019, Wyndham, Western Australia
 28 September 2019, Wyndham, Western Australia, during the first flight after the first incident in March 2019
 19 August 2022, Arizona, just before breaking the record for the longest flight of any aircraft (a total of 64 days)

See also

 NASA Pathfinder (First flew in June 1983)
 NASA Centurion (First flight 10 November 1998)
 NASA/AeroVironment Helios Prototype (First flight 8 September 1999)
 Facebook Aquila (First flight	28 June 2016)
 SoftBank/AeroVironment HAPSMobile (First flight 11 September 2019) 
 BAE Systems PHASA-35 (First flight 17 February 2020)

Notes and references

External links
 
 

2000s British experimental aircraft
Zephyr
Solar-powered aircraft
Unmanned military aircraft of the United Kingdom
High-altitude and long endurance aircraft
Airbus Defence and Space aircraft